Wiesław Rozłucki (born 1947) is a Polish economist, co-founder of the Warsaw Stock Exchange and its first chairman (1991–2006). Since 1990 occupied various advisory positions to Polish government and various supervisory positions in public companies, foundations and organizations.

Awards and recognition
1995:National Order of Merit (France)  
2000: Commander's Cross of the Order of Polonia Restituta
2007: interred into the Polish Economy Hall of Fame
2011: Commander's Cross wits Star of the Order of Polonia Restituta

References

Polish economists
1947 births
Living people